Trà Ôn is a township and capital of Trà Ôn District, Vĩnh Long Province, Vietnam.

References

Populated places in Vĩnh Long province
District capitals in Vietnam
Townships in Vietnam